Broadway Market is a street in the London Borough of Hackney, best known for the street market held there. Licences to trade are issued by a committee of councillors from Hackney London Borough Council.

The street is on the traditional boundary of the Haggerston area of Shoreditch (the south-west part of the street) and Hackney proper. Old 'Borough of Shoreditch' signs can still be seen above street name signs in that south-west part of the street.

History

In 1893 the London County Council's Public Control Committee states that the Market had existed since 1883 on the southern end of the Street between Andrew Street and Duncan Road and consisted of 35 stalls selling: vegetables and fruit, flowers, eggs, meat, fish, bacon, earthenware, drapery, iron and tinware, mats and pails, and caps and belts. The report describes a growing market serving a local, over-crowded, working-class community.

Of the 35 stalls 10 are recorded as being run by Broadway Market shopkeepers with the remainder being independent street traders.

In 1936, whilst calling the market London Fields, Benedetta describes the market as a weekday market with a smaller presence on Sundays and reports that it has "almost every kind of stall".

Before the late 20th century, it was the site of a busy fruit and vegetable market, but this slowly dwindled over time—in the early 2000s, market activity was limited to a couple of stalls selling produce. On 8 May 2004 a food market was launched on Saturdays which has since become firmly established. Broadway Market is closed to traffic when the market is being held (9am–5pm). Thanks largely to the market a number of new restaurants and boutiques have opened in the area.

The ongoing development of Broadway Market has sparked a local debate about the perceived gentrification of Hackney and the way Hackney council disposed of some of their commercial property portfolio.  In late 2005, a group of local protestors occupied 34 Broadway Market (Francesca's café) to bring attention to the issue.  Despite being evicted on 21 December 2005 the building was successfully reoccupied on 27 December (replacing the demolished roof in the process) before the protestors were again evicted on 23 February 2006.

In popular culture

The market was the location of filming for some scenes in the 1947 film Odd Man Out, and the opening scenes of the 1988 movie Buster were shot at the Regent's Canal end of the street. The market, and specifically the barber shop, was the location for David Cronenberg's 2007 film, Eastern Promises, and the market and surrounding area appeared in the Netflix drama series Top Boy.

Along with many squares and streets in the East End of London, it is rumoured that the old Broadway Market partly inspired the BBC soap opera EastEnders.

Gallery

See also
Ben Eine (artist)

References

External links
Broadway Market Website of the Broadway Market Traders and Residents Association
Save Tony's Café! Ongoing Broadway Market Campaign news
EASTeight Magazine for the Broadway Market area
'Market forces' Hari Kunzru, The Guardian, December 2005
'The Cleansing of Hackney' Paul Kingsnorth, The Ecologist, March 2006
'The best on Broadway' Tom Moggach, thelondonpaper, December 2006

Streets in the London Borough of Hackney
Retail markets in London